Paramelhania is a genus of flowering plants belonging to the family Malvaceae.

Its native range is Madagascar.

Species
Species:
 Paramelhania decaryana Arènes

References

Dombeyoideae
Malvaceae genera
Endemic flora of Madagascar